All of This and Nothing is the first compilation album by the English rock band the Psychedelic Furs, released in 1988 by Columbia Records. The album has 14 songs, including one — "All That Money Wants" — recorded specifically for the collection.

Reception 

The album peaked at No. 67 in the UK Albums Chart 
and No. 102 in the US Billboard 200 chart. 
AllMusic writer Michael Sutton said the album "effectively summarizes the Psychedelic Furs' evolution from a left-of-center British rock band to a stylish alternative pop act".
A Rolling Stone review was critical of the album for omitting too many of the band's early singles, such as "Run and Run" and "Into You Like a Train", though it also called All of This and Nothing their best album to include "The Ghost in You" and "Heaven".

Track listing 
 "President Gas" (John Ashton, Richard Butler, Tim Butler, Vince Ely) - 5:16
 "All That Money Wants" (Ashton, R. Butler, T. Butler) - 3:46
 "Imitation of Christ" (Ashton, R. Butler, T. Butler, Ely, Duncan Kilburn, Roger Morris) - 5:29
 "Sister Europe" (Ashton, R. Butler, T. Butler, Ely, Kilburn, Morris) - 5:41
 "Love My Way" (Ashton, R. Butler, T. Butler, Ely) - 3:33
 "No Easy Street" (Ashton, R. Butler, T. Butler, Ely) - 4:03
 "Highwire Days" (Ashton, R. Butler) - 4:03
 "She Is Mine" (Ashton, R. Butler, T. Butler, Ely, Kilburn, Morris) - 3:52
 "Dumb Waiters" (Ashton, R. Butler, T. Butler, Ely, Kilburn, Morris) - 5:06
 "Pretty in Pink" (Ashton, R. Butler, T. Butler, Ely, Kilburn, Morris) - 3:59
 "The Ghost in You" (R. Butler, T. Butler) - 4:16
 "Heaven" (R. Butler, T. Butler) - 3:27
 "Heartbreak Beat" (Ashton, R. Butler, T. Butler) - 5:11
 "All of This and Nothing" (Ashton, R. Butler, T. Butler, Ely, Kilburn, Morris) - 6:25

Chart performance
Album

Single

References

External links 
 

1988 greatest hits albums
The Psychedelic Furs compilation albums
Columbia Records compilation albums